César Figueroa Hernández (born 19 October 1977) is a Mexican former professional boxer who competed from 1996 to 2008, challenging for the WBO super bantamweight title in 2008.

Professional career

Mexico National Championship
In June 2001, Pérez upset the veteran Emidgio Gastelum by T.K.O. to win the Mexican National featherweight title.

On 28 February 2003 Marco Angel lost to Humberto Soto at the Orleans Hotel and Casino in Las Vegas.

References

External links

Boxers from Mexico City
Featherweight boxers
1977 births
Living people
Mexican male boxers